Mir Bankesh (also Romanized as Mīr Bankesh and Mīr Bangesh; also known as Mīr Nabgesh) is a village in Meyami Rural District, Razaviyeh District, Mashhad County, Razavi Khorasan Province, Iran. At the 2006 census, its population was 276, in 63 families.

References 

Populated places in Mashhad County